Canada Dry is a brand of soft drinks founded in 1904 and owned since 2008 by the American company Dr Pepper Snapple (now Keurig Dr Pepper). For over 100 years, Canada Dry has been known mainly for its ginger ale, though the company also manufactures a number of other soft drinks and mixers. Although Canada Dry originated in Canada, as the brand name suggests, it is now produced in many countries such as the United States, Panama,  Mexico, Chile, Costa Rica, Japan, and in a number of countries of Europe and the Middle East.

Etymology

The "Dry" in the brand's name refers to not being sweet, as in a dry wine. When John J. McLaughlin, who first formulated "Canada Dry Pale Ginger Ale", originally made his new soft drink, it was far less sweet than other ginger ales then available; as a result, he labelled it "dry".

History

In 1890, Canadian pharmacist and chemist John J. McLaughlin of Enniskillen, Ontario (Hamlet), after working in a soda factory in Brooklyn, New York, opened a carbonated water plant in Toronto. McLaughlin was the eldest son of Robert McLaughlin, founder of McLaughlin Carriage and McLaughlin Motor Car. In 1904, McLaughlin created "Canada Dry Pale Ginger Ale". Three years later, the drink was appointed to the Viceregal Household of the Governor General of Canada and the label featuring a beaver atop a map of Canada was replaced with the present crown and shield label.

When McLaughlin began shipping his product to New York, it became so popular that he opened a plant in Manhattan shortly thereafter. After McLaughlin's death in 1914, the company was run briefly by his brother, Samuel McLaughlin. P. D. Saylor and Associates bought the business from the McLaughlin family in 1923 and formed Canada Dry Ginger Ale, Inc., a public company.

Canada Dry's popularity as a mixer began during Prohibition, when its flavor helped mask the taste of homemade liquor. In the 1930s, Canada Dry expanded worldwide. From the 1950s onward, the company introduced a larger number of products.

Norton Simon took an interest in the company in 1964, and it merged with Simon's other holdings, the McCall Corporation and Hunt Foods, to form Norton Simon Inc. Dr Pepper bought Canada Dry from Norton Simon in 1982. In 1984, Dr Pepper was acquired by Forstmann Little & Company, and Canada Dry was sold to R. J. Reynolds' Del Monte Foods unit to pay off acquisition debt. RJR Nabisco sold its soft drink business to Cadbury Schweppes in 1986. Today, Canada Dry is owned by Keurig Dr Pepper, which was spun off from Cadbury Schweppes in 2008.

'Made from Real Ginger' lawsuits
In 2019, Canada Dry faced a false advertisement lawsuit from the U.S. Government. According to researchers, the drink did not have enough ginger for it to have health benefits and for the company to claim that it was "made from real ginger." Instead of defending their ginger content by going to court, they decided to settle by no longer making this claim. Dr Pepper decided to offer payment to those who purchased Canada Dry for personal use since 2013.

After the settlement with the U.S. Government, a class-action lawsuit has also been requested in Canada. , Canada Dry still advertised their drinks as "made from real ginger" in Canada. The Supreme Court of British Columbia case was settled with the defendant Canada Dry Mott's Inc. agreeing to pay $200,000, inclusive of all expenses and fees, plus disbursements of $18,607.61, but it did not require the defendant to change its product labelling or advertising for products marketed in Canada. The settlement amount was to be distributed to the class members by way of cy-près donation to the Law Foundation of British Columbia, while two lead plaintiffs, Victor Cardoso and Lionel Ravvin, received $1,500 each. On August 9, 2022, Canada Dry announced a new logo on their Canadian Facebook page. As such, it is currently unknown if this logo will be used outside of Canada.

Products

 Canada Dry Ginger Ale
 Diet Canada Dry Ginger Ale (rebranded in November 2020 as Canada Dry Zero Sugar)
 Canada Dry Bold Ginger Ale
 Canada Dry Ten
 Canada Dry Ginger Ale and Lemonade
 Diet Canada Dry Ginger Ale and Lemonade
 Canada Dry Ginger Ale and Orangeade
 Canada Dry Club Soda
 Canada Dry Tonic Water with Quinine
 Diet Canada Dry Tonic Water with Quinine
 Canada Dry Bitter Lemon
 Canada Dry Lime Ricky
 Canada Dry Tahitian Treat (now just Tahitian Treat)
 Canada Dry Hi-Spot Apple, Hi-Spot Orange, Hi-Spot Tutti (cherry and fruit punch) and Hi-Spot Lithiated Lemon
 Canada Dry Golden Cockerel Ginger Beer
 Canada Dry Sparkling Green Tea Ginger Ale
 Canada Dry White Tea with Raspberry Ginger Ale
 Canada Dry Cranberry Ginger Ale
 Diet Canada Dry Cranberry Ginger Ale
 Canada Dry Blackberry Ginger Ale
 Canada Dry Blueberry Ginger Ale
 Canada Dry Lemon Ginger Ale
 Canada Dry Sparkling Seltzer Water (unflavored and mineral free)
 Canada Dry Flavored Sparkling Seltzer Water (Lemon Lime, Mandarin Orange, Raspberry, Triple Berry, Pomegranate Cherry, Peach Mango and Cranberry Lime; all available in low sodium and sodium free varieties) 
 Sussex Golden Ginger Ale
 Sussex Pale Dry Ginger Ale
 Sussex Red Oval Ginger Ale
 Sussex Old English Ginger Beer
 Sussex Cola
 Cactus Cooler
 Purple Passion
 Canada Dry Lemon Soda
 Canada Dry Lemon Lime Soda
 Canada Dry Vanilla Cream Soda
 Canada Dry Cocoa Cream Soda
 Canada Dry Wild Cherry Soda
 Canada Dry Black Cherry Soda
 Canada Dry Sunripe Orange Soda
 Canada Dry Mandarin Orange Soda
 Canada Dry Concord Grape Soda
 Canada Dry Grapefruit Soda
 Canada Dry Spur Cola
 Canada Dry Sport Cola (a caffeine-free cola introduced in 1968, then discontinued in the 1970s)
 Canada Dry Jamaica Cola
 Canada Dry Rooti Root Beer
 Canada Dry Barrelhead Root Beer
 Canada Dry Wink
 Canada Dry Pink Wink
 Canada Dry Collins Mixer
 Canada Dry Tonic Water Mixer with Quinine
 Canada Dry Hi-Grape

Brands with limited availability
Limited availability flavors are produced in Pennsauken Township, New Jersey, by Pepsi-Cola/National Brand Beverages and are distributed in southern New Jersey, Delaware, southeastern Pennsylvania, eastern Maryland, and northern Virginia. At one time, the flavors all had uniquely designed labels; but now all of them use the standard Canada Dry crest logo.

Brands with limited availability in the United States include:
 Canada Dry Pineapple
 Canada Dry Peach
 Black Cherry Wishniak
 Island Lime
 Wild Cherry
 Vanilla Cream
 Blackberry Ginger Ale
 Cranberry Ginger Ale (nationwide; however, only sold during the Christmas season)

Locale-specific brands

Asia
 Canada Dry "Dry" Ginger Ale (Japan)

The Middle East
 Canada Dry UAE Dubai 
 Canada Dry Dana
 Canada Dry Orange Soda (Iran)
 Canada Dry Cream Soda (the Middle East)

South America
 Pink Grapefruit Canada Dry (Peru)
 Canada Dry Limón Soda (Chile)

North America
 Cranberry Ginger Ale (Canada during the Christmas season, although also available in the United States during the Christmas season)
 Blackberry Ginger Ale (Canada, spring 2016; also sold in some U.S. stores as 20 oz. bottles, but not all stores that sell Canada Dry sell the Blackberry variant)
 Canada Dry Pineapple (U.S.)
 Canada Dry Peach (U.S.)
 Black Cherry Wishniak (U.S.)
 Island Lime (U.S.)
 Wild Cherry (U.S.)
 Vanilla Cream (U.S.)

Marketing
Nylon Studios produced the song used in the Rabbit's "Jack's Farm" commercial featuring Canada Dry Ginger Ale. A Cantonese version of the ad was also produced.

See also
 Canada Dry–Gazelle
 List of Canadian inventions and discoveries

References

Notes

Bibliography
 Robertson, Heather (1995). Driving Force: The McLaughlin Family and the Age of the Car. Toronto: McClelland & Stewart Ltd.

External links

 Canada Dry (Canada)
 Canada Dry  (USA)
 Canada Dry (Japan)
 
 

1904 establishments in Ontario
Products introduced in 1904
Canadian brands
Canadian drinks
Keurig Dr Pepper brands
Ginger ale
Historic American Engineering Record in Maryland
Historic American Engineering Record in Oregon
Canadian cuisine
Soft drinks manufacturers